Billy Konstantinidis, also known as Vasilis Konstantinidis (born 21 April 1986) is a Greek-Australian footballer who plays as a forward for NPL Victoria club South Melbourne FC.

Career
He signed for Aris in January 2015 making his debut and scoring against Aris Akropotamos F.C.scoring in the 88th minute. He scored his second goal a 90th-minute winner against Kavala in only his 3rd game and 2nd game at Kleanthis Vikelidis stadium. Konstandinidis plays friendly games for Melbourne City every year. Konstandinidis has been subject of a league interest from the Central Coast Mariners Adelaide United and Melbourne City but a move never materialized.

He returned to Veria on 2 September 2016. On 15 September 2017, he signed a contract with Japanese club Ventforet Kofu.

In February 2019, Konstantinidis returned to Australia, signing on for the 2019 NPL Victoria season with South Melbourne FC. At the end of January 2020, Billy returned to Greece and joined AS Ano Meras, before taking the trip on to AO Mykonos in July 2020.

References

External links

 
Myplayer.gr Profile

1986 births
Living people
Greek footballers
Greek expatriate footballers
Australian soccer players
Australian people of Greek descent
Association football midfielders
Veria F.C. players
PAS Lamia 1964 players
Niki Volos F.C. players
Pierikos F.C. players
Iraklis Thessaloniki F.C. players
Nafpaktiakos Asteras F.C. players
Panserraikos F.C. players
Doxa Drama F.C. players
Aris Thessaloniki F.C. players
Irodotos FC players
Ventforet Kofu players
South Melbourne FC players
National Premier Leagues players
Greek expatriate sportspeople in Japan
Expatriate footballers in Japan
Soccer players from Melbourne
Australian expatriate sportspeople in Japan
Australian expatriate soccer players